William Henry Roberts (22 July 1910 – 8 December 1973) was an Australian rules footballer who played with Essendon in the Victorian Football League (VFL).

Family
The son of Charles George Roberts (1881–1961), and Ellen Louisa Roberts (1884–1972), née Harris, William Henry Roberts was born at Nhill, Victoria on 22 July 1910.

He married Gwen Molloy (1919-2004) in 1937.

Football
Recruited from the Nhill Football Club in 1931.

Essendon (VFL)
He played for the First XVIII in six consecutive home-and-away games in 1931, and in 3 consecutive home-and-away games in 1933.

Horsham (WFL)
In 1946 he was appointed non-playing coach of the Horsham Football Club in the Wimmera Football League.

Military service
Roberts served in the Royal Australian Air Force during World War II.

Death
He died at Seville, Victoria on 8 December 1973.

Notes

References
 World War Two Nominal Roll: Aircraftman 1 William Henry Roberts (53856), Department of Veterans' Affairs.
 A9301, 53856: World War Two Service Record: Aircraftman 1 William Henry Roberts (53856), National Archives of Australia.
 
 Maplestone, M., Flying Higher: History of the Essendon Football Club 1872–1996, Essendon Football Club, (Melbourne), 1996.

External links 

1910 births
1973 deaths
Australian rules footballers from Victoria (Australia)
Essendon Football Club players
Nhill Football Club players